Thavarina Thottilu is a 1996 Indian Kannada-language drama film directed by S. Narayan and written by Ajay Kumar. The film cast includes Ramkumar, Charan Raj and Shruti. The film was produced by Narayan's home production while the original score and soundtrack were composed by Rajesh Ramanath. The film was remade in Tamil as Annan Thangachi directed by actor Charanraj who reprised his role along with Shruti.

Cast
 Ramkumar 
 Shruti 
 Charan Raj
 Srinivasa Murthy
 Doddanna
 Ashalatha
 Rajanand
 Padma Vasanthi
 B. Jayamma

Soundtrack
The music of the film was composed by Rajesh Ramanath and lyrics written by S. Narayan.

References

External source

 Tavarina Tottilu(1996)

1996 films
1990s Kannada-language films
Indian drama films
Films directed by S. Narayan
Kannada films remade in other languages
1996 drama films

Films scored by Rajesh Ramnath